Mincom Pty Ltd was a software and services company that provides business software to industries including mining, public infrastructure, defence, oil and gas in more than 40 countries across North America, South America, Australia, South East Asia, Africa, and Europe.

Mincom Inc. operates in North America and is a subsidiary of Mincom Pty Ltd. Mincom employs 1250 people in 24 offices across six continents.

Mincom was owned by Francisco Partners, a global private equity firm focused exclusively on investments in technology and technology-enabled services businesses. On 9 May 2011 the ABB Group acquired Mincom to expand their enterprise software business, Ventyx.

The company's name was originally devised as a contraction of the term "mining computing", as the company's initial products were aimed at the mining industry.

Mincom's headquarters were located in Brisbane, Queensland as well as with offices presence in Sydney, Melbourne, Perth, Western Australia. North American operations are located in the United States (Denver, Colorado, San Francisco, California and Austin, Texas) and in Canada (Ottawa, Ontario). Latin American offices are in Santiago, Chile.

MineMarket
MineMarket is a software application produced by Mincom Limited for the mining industry.

The application is claimed to provide a whole-of-enterprise view of the supply chain, from ore extraction to product delivery, including external processes such as delivery arrangements. The MineMarket solution provides coverage of the logistics and sales processes for mining and mineral related organisations.

It is designed to run on the Microsoft Windows family of operating systems. The current major release of MineMarket is version 4.

Mincom Critical Inventory Optimization
MCIO is a software application purchased by Mincom Limited from Bruce McNaught and Associates Pty Ltd.

The application is claimed to offer the ability for any company holding a large inventory to substantially reduce the inventory value while improving the service level on critical stick items. 

Originally known as SIAM, MCIO integrates with Mincom's main Ellipse Asset management platform. It is designed to run on the Microsoft Windows family of operating systems. The current major release of MCIO is version 4.3 which is a fully multilingual version of the product.

Awards 
Mincom was inducted into the Queensland Business Leaders Hall of Fame in 2017.

See also
 ABB
 Enterprise asset management

References

External Links 

 Mincom digital story and oral history: Queensland Business Leaders Hall of Fame 2016, State Library of Queensland

Software companies established in 1979
ERP software companies
Software companies of Australia
Business services companies established in 1979
Australian companies established in 1979
Australian companies disestablished in 2011
Software companies disestablished in 2011
Defunct technology companies of Australia